The eleventh season of Criminal Minds was ordered on May 11, 2015 by CBS. It premiered on September 30, 2015 on CBS and ended on May 4, 2016. The season consisted of 22 episodes.

Cast 
The entire main cast returned for the season, except Jennifer Love Hewitt (Kate Callahan), who left the show in the season ten finale. On June 22, 2015, it was announced that Aisha Tyler (coincidentally Hewitt's co-star during Season 1 of Ghost Whisperer) would replace Hewitt in a recurring role as Dr. Tara Lewis, a psychologist with an eye on forensic psychology and its application toward the criminal justice system.

Main

 Joe Mantegna as Supervisory Special Agent David Rossi (BAU Senior Agent)
 Shemar Moore as Supervisory Special Agent Derek Morgan (BAU Agent) (Ep. 1-18)
 Matthew Gray Gubler as Supervisory Special Agent Dr. Spencer Reid (BAU Agent)
 A. J. Cook as Supervisory Special Agent Jennifer "JJ" Jareau (BAU Agent)
 Kirsten Vangsness as Special Agent Penelope Garcia (BAU Technical Analyst & Co-Communications Liaison)
 Thomas Gibson as Supervisory Special Agent Aaron Hotchner (BAU Unit Chief & Co-Communications Liaison)

Special guest star 
 Paget Brewster as Agent Emily Prentiss (Chief of Interpol-London Office) (Episode 19)

Recurring cast 

 Aisha Tyler as Supervisory Special Agent Dr. Tara Lewis (BAU Agent)
 Rochelle Aytes as Savannah Hayes
 Amber Stevens as Joy Struthers
 Cade Owens as Jack Hotchner
 Josh Stewart as William "Will" LaMontagne Jr.
 Mekhai Andersen as Henry LaMontagne
 Phoenix Andersen as Michael LaMontagne
 Marisol Nichols as Agent Natalie Colfax 
 Frances Fisher as Antonia Slade 
 Sheryl Lee Ralph as Hayden Montgomery
 Bodhi Elfman as Peter Lewis / Mr. Scratch
 Aubrey Plaza as Cat Adams

Production 
Jennifer Love Hewitt left the show because of her pregnancy, and her character Kate Callahan, handed in her resignation at the end of the season ten finale, due to her pregnancy and decision to devote the next year to her baby. It was announced that Aisha Tyler would replace Hewitt in a recurring role as Dr. Tara Lewis. A.J. Cook revealed herself to be pregnant, and it was later revealed in the tenth-season finale that her character Jennifer "JJ" Jareau was also pregnant. She did not appear in the first six episodes (except the season premiere). Showrunner Erica Messer expressed her desire about bringing back old characters from previous seasons, including Spencer Reid's mother played by Jane Lynch. Cook appeared in the first episode "The Job" holding her sleeping baby Michael, played by Phoenix Andersen, her child in real life. 

Matthew Gray Gubler directed episode 18, "A Beautiful Disaster", in which Shemar Moore left the main cast (Moore went on to star as Hondo Harrelson in the CBS remake of SWAT). On February 10, 2016, it was announced that Paget Brewster would return as Emily Prentiss for one episode later in season 11 episode 19, titled "Tribute". The season ended on May 4, 2016, with the show's first cliffhanger finale since the fifth season. Messer said she felt it was time for another cliffhanger and thought that it served as a "really fun launch pad" into the twelfth season, which was officially ordered two days later.

Guest stars 

A. J. Cook announced her pregnancy, a fact that was carried over to her character Jennifer "JJ" Jareau as well. Showrunner Erica Messer stated in an interview that Cook's character JJ would not appear for the first five episodes of the season as Cook was on maternity leave. Messer continued talking about a guest star to replace Cook during her absence from the show as she said, "My hope is we could have a fun guest star when A.J.'s on maternity leave. It will be different because JJ won't be there. There is no replacing her as we know, but there's an opportunity there to have fun for a few episodes." 

Aisha Tyler joined the cast in the wake of Hewitt's exit, and played a recurring role as Dr. Tara Lewis, a forensic psychologist who always wanted to study psychopaths up close, to understand the human being behind the evil acts. Her previous job was to interview serial killers and determine whether they were fit to stand trial. It was announced that Tim Kang would guest-star on the show in the second episode of the season, "The Witness". while Marisol Nichols is set to make an appearance. It was announced on August 5, 2015, that an alum from Glee, Ashley Fink, would guest star in the third episode of the season, "'Til Death Do Us Part". Amber Stevens returned as Rossi's daughter, Joy Struthers, in episode seven, "Target Rich". Aubrey Plaza also had a guest role in episode eleven, "Entropy".

On January 14, 2016, CBS announced that actor Danny Glover would guest-star as Derek Morgan's deceased father in the episode "Derek".

On February 10, 2016, CBS announced that actor Paget Brewster would guest star in one episode in the latter part of the season, reprising her role as Emily Prentiss.

In an interview with TVGuide, Erica Messer expressed her interest about bringing back characters from previous seasons instead of adding a new character to replace Hewitt permanently on the show. She explained, "I feel like when you look at 10 years of people we could bring back, it would be fun to do that." Messer added that bringing back old characters would allow the show to focus on the team without having to service a new regular character.

Episodes

Ratings

Live + SD ratings

Live + 7 Day (DVR) ratings

Home media

References

External links
 

Criminal Minds
2015 American television seasons
2016 American television seasons